Bashir Hossain is a Bangladeshi film editor and director. He won the Bangladesh National Film Award for Best Editing three consecutive times, for the films Lathial (1975), Matir Maya (1976), and Simana Periye (1977). Although best known as an editor, he also directed the 1966 film 13 Number Feku Ostagar Lane.

Selected films

Awards and nominations
National Film Awards

References

External links
 

1934 births
1978 deaths
Bangladeshi film editors
Bangladeshi film directors
People from Comilla
Best Editor National Film Award (Bangladesh) winners